Brezje pri Lekmarju is a small settlement in the Municipality of Šmarje pri Jelšah in eastern Slovenia. It lies in the Kozje region south of Šmarje and east of Sveti Štefan. The area is part of the traditional region of Styria. The municipality is now included in the Savinja Statistical Region.

Name
The name of the settlement was changed from Brezje to Brezje pri Lekmarju in 1953.

References

External links
Brezje pri Lekmarju at Geopedia

Populated places in the Municipality of Šmarje pri Jelšah